The 2017 World Long Distance Mountain Running Championships (or 2017 World Long Distance MR Championships), was the 14th edition of the global Mountain running competition, World Long Distance Mountain Running Championships, organised by the World Mountain Running Association and was held in Premana, Italy on 6 August 2017.

Results

Men individual (32 km/+ 2900 m) 
Puppi was elected world champion after the doping disqualification imposed on Eritrean Petro Mamu.

Women individual (32 km)

Team men

Team women

References

External links
 World Mountain Running Association official web site

World Long Distance Mountain Running Championships
World Long Distance Mountain Running